Duchcov is a town in Teplice District in the Ústí nad Labem Region of the Czech Republic. It has about 8,600 inhabitants. Duchcov is known for the Duchcov Castle. The historic town centre with the castle complex is well preserved and is protected by law as an urban monument zone.

Geography
It lies in the Most Basin. The Loučeňský Stream flows through the town. The town is surrounded by several ponds and artificial lakes.

History

The first written mention of Duchcov is from 1207, referring to the older name Hrabišín. The name of Duchcov is first mentioned in 1240. In the 14th century, Duchcov was a serf town surrounded by walls with three gates. In these times, the Romanesque Church of St. George and the Dominican monastery were in the town. At the turn of the 15th and 16th centuries, Duchcov became the seat of the estate owners, the Kaplíř of Sulevice family, and in the 16th century, the Lobkowicz family acquired Duchcov. By marrying a widow from the Lobkowicz family, the Wallenstein family acquired the town.

A brewery was established in 1675. In 1763, the first coal mine was opened near the town. In the 19th century, Duchcov got industrial character. A sugar factory and a porcelain factory were established. In 1867, the railroad was built, which enabled the rapid development of coal mining. Due to the influx of workers from the hinterland, the town with a German majority was transformed into a Czech town.

Until 1918, Dux (bilingual names Dux – Duchcov at the end of the 19th century) was part of the Austrian monarchy (Austria side after the compromise of 1867), head of the district with the same name, one of the 94 Bezirkshauptmannschaften in Bohemia.

In 1918, Duchcov became a part of independent Czechoslovakia. In 1938, as a result of the Munich Agreement, the town was ceded to Nazi Germany as one of the municipalities in Sudetenland. It was placed until 1945 under the administration of the Regierungsbezirk Aussig of Reichsgau Sudetenland. In May 1945, after the liberation of Czechoslovakia, Duchcov returned under Czechoslovak administration. The Sudeten German population was expelled in 1945 and replaced by Czech settlers.

Demographics

Sights
Duchcov Castle is the main landmark. The castle was built in the 13th century as a fort and later was rebuilt in the Neoclassical style. The Duchcov Castle is open to visitors.

The Church of the Annunciation of Our Lady is located next to the castle, on Republiky Square in the historic centre. It was built in the 1720s in the Baroque style. Other valuable buildings on the square include the fountain with the statue of Saint Florian from 1728 and Column of the Holy Trinity, built in 1750–1760.

Notable people
Giacomo Casanova (1725–1798), Italian adventurer; lived and died here
Bohumil Bydžovský (1880–1969), mathematician
Egon von Jordan (1902–1978), Austrian actor
Iva Budařová (born 1960), tennis player
Štěpán Vachoušek (born 1979), footballer
Eva Birnerová (born 1984), tennis player

Twin towns – sister cities

Duchcov is twinned with:
 Miltenberg, Germany
 Mulda, Germany

References

External links

 
Description of the city on Bohemianet

Cities and towns in the Czech Republic
Populated places in Teplice District
Towns in the Ore Mountains